Chukrasia tabularis, the Indian mahogany, is a deciduous, tropical forest tree species in the family Meliaceae.  It is native to Bangladesh, Cambodia, China, India, Indonesia, Laos, Malaysia, Myanmar, Sri Lanka, Thailand, and 
Vietnam. Also introduced to many western countries such as Cameroon, Costa Rica, Nigeria, Puerto Rico, South Africa, and United States.

The genus Chukrasia is monotypic, with previously recognised species now considered to be synonyms. "C. velutina" (this species) is listed as the provincial flower and tree of Phrae Province, Thailand and is widely used in Ayurveda as an important medicinal plant.

Description
The trees are tall with a cylindrical bole and spreading crown. C. velutina leaves are abruptly pinnate or bipinnate with leaflets that alternate or are subopposite, entire and unequal at the base. The erect, oblong flowers, which are rather large and born in terminal panicles, possess four to five petals.  Mature fruits are a septifragally three to five valved capsule.

Chemical constituents
Leaves of C. velutina contain quercetin and its 3-galactoside, galloyl glucoside, tannic acid and a flavone. The bark contains sitosterol, melianone, scopoletin, 6,7-dimethoxycoumarin, tetranorterpenes and tabularin. The wood contains bussein homologue and chukrasins A, B, C, D and F. The root contains a triterpene, cedrelone. Seeds contain tetranorterpenes, phragmalin esters and 12 α-OAc-phyramalin. Four new meliacin esters 3,30-diisobutyrates and 3-isobutyrate-30-propionates of phragmalin and 12-acetoxyphragmalin have also been isolated from seeds.

Common names
English - Bastard cedar, White cedar, East-Indian mahogany, Indian redwood, Burma almond wood, Chickrassy, Chittagong wood 
Hindi - Chikrasi (चिकरासी) 
Manipuri - Taimareng (তাঈমৰেঙ) 
Telugu - Kondavepa 
Tamil - Malei veppu (மலை வேப்பு) 
Kannada - Kalgarike 
Malayalam - Suvannakil 
Myanmar - Yinmarbin (ယင်းမာပင်) (ယင္းမာ)
Bengali - Chikrassi 
Assamese - Boga-poma
Sinhala - Hulan hik (හුලං හික් ) / Hirikita (හිරිකිත)
Vietnamese - Lát hoa

References

External links
 Chukrasia tabularis A. Juss. - MELIACEAE, biotik.org

Meliaceae
Plants described in 1846
Flora of tropical Asia
Trees of China
Meliaceae genera
Monotypic Sapindales genera